The TurnTable Top 50 (also known as  TurnTable Nigeria Top 50 Albums chart) is the official album streaming chart in Nigeria. It is compiled every Tuesday by a Nigeria-based music digital streaming tracking company and published every Tuesday by TurnTable magazine. The list shows the 50 best-streaming music albums of the moment in Nigeria. The first issue of the Nigeria Top 50, was launched on Tuesday, 8 November 2022, and the first number-one album was Mr. Money with the Vibe by Asake.

History
On 31 March 2022, TurnTable announce the expansion of the TurnTable Top 50 songs chart, into Top 100. According to the co-founder, and editor-in-chief of the magazine, Ayomide Oriowo, "The chart expansion will be supported by TurnTable Top 200, as the official album-based chart". On 8 November 2022, the album's official chart, began operation as the current TurnTable Top 50 chart.

The chart rankings are based on streams data from YouTube, Boomplay Music, Audiomack, Apple Music, Deezer, and Spotify in Nigeria. On 11 November 2022, the chart eventually became the one main all-genre albums chart, following the launch of the seven genre component of the TurnTable Nigerian Top 50 Albums chart; which include:
Afro-Pop Albums:
Afro-R&B Albums:
Hip-Hop/Rap Albums:
Street-Pop Albums:
Gospel Albums:
Traditional Albums:
Alternative Albums:

Policy
The chart retains a similar system to the existing Top Streaming Songs chart, which is a point-per-play system that determines the values of streams on different streaming platforms. Paid streams will be weighted as one point per play value, freemium streams will be weighted as 0.75 points per play, ad-supported video streams from YouTube will be weighted as 0.66 points per play while ad-supported streams will be weighted as 0.5 points per play. The album chart as well as other genre-based consumption-ranked album charts will employ a single tier (equating 1,500 streams as one album unit) for on-demand audio streams (paid or ad-supported) from subscription services. Video streams will also contribute to the Top 50 Albums Chart.

Number ones

2022

2023

References

Nigerian record charts
2022 establishments in Nigeria